Bethel Township is one of ten townships in Posey County, Indiana. As of the 2000 census, its population was 327.

History
Bethel Township was organized in 1821. The township was named for P. C. Bethel, a pioneer settler.

Adjacent Townships
Indiana
Posey County
Robb Township
Gibson County
Wabash Township
Illinois
White County
Gray Township
Phillips Township

Towns
Griffin

Unincorporated Places
New Baltimore

References

External links
 Indiana Township Association
 United Township Association of Indiana

Townships in Posey County, Indiana
Townships in Indiana